The Pakistan national cricket team toured Australia in the 1964–65 season and played 4 first-class matches, including the inaugural Test match between Australia and Pakistan in Australia. The two countries had already played each other in Pakistan.

During this tour, Arif Butt became the first Pakistani player to take a five-wicket haul on his Test debut, taking six wickets for 89 runs.

Test match summary

References

Annual reviews
 Playfair Cricket Annual 1965
 Wisden Cricketers' Almanack 1965

Further reading
 Bill Frindall, The Wisden Book of Test Cricket 1877-1978, Wisden, 1979
 Chris Harte, A History of Australian Cricket, André Deutsch, 1993
 Ray Robinson, On Top Down Under, Cassell, 1975

External links
 CricketArchive – tour summaries

1964 in Australian cricket
1964 in Pakistani cricket
1965 in Australian cricket
1965 in Pakistani cricket
Australian cricket seasons from 1945–46 to 1969–70
International cricket competitions from 1960–61 to 1970
1964-65